Wise Guys is a 1986 American black comedy crime film directed by Brian De Palma and produced by Aaron Russo from a screenplay written by George Gallo and Norman Steinberg. It stars Danny DeVito and Joe Piscopo as two small-time mobsters from Newark, New Jersey, and features Harvey Keitel, Ray Sharkey, Lou Albano, Dan Hedaya, and Frank Vincent.

Plot
Italian American Harry Valentini and his Jewish friend and next-door neighbor Moe Dickstein occupy the bottom rung of Newark Mafia boss Anthony Castelo's gang. Making a living by doing Castelo's lowest jobs (such as looking after his goldfish, testing out bullet-proof jackets, or checking the boss's car for bombs) the two men dream of opening the world's first Jewish-Italian delicatessen. However, they get little to no respect from their boss or his subordinates, who frequently ridicule them. They accompany Frank "The Fixer" Acavano, one of Castelo's top men and a violent yet gluttonous psychopath, to Meadowlands Racetrack to place a bet on Castelo's behalf. Valentini changes horses at the last minute because his boss usually bets on the wrong one. However, this time Castelo had fixed the race, meaning that Harry and Moe now owe their boss $250,000. After a night of torture, both are forced to agree to kill each other.

Unaware that each has made a deal and frightened following the murder of Harry's cousin, Marco, they steal Acavano's Cadillac and travel to Atlantic City to see Harry's uncle Mike, a retired mobster who started Castelo in the crime business. After using Acavano's credit cards to pay for a luxury stay in a hotel owned by their old friend Bobby DiLea, the two go to Uncle Mike's house to ask for help. They find only Uncle Mike's ashes, leading to Moe leaving in disgust. Grandma Valentini, however, is able to give Harry the money he owes. Harry tries to get DiLea to sort things out with Castelo. As he and Moe leave the hotel, their limo is being driven by Acavano, after DiLea appears to double-cross the two. Harry luckily spies Castelo's hitmen and decides to stay behind and gamble the money. After a chase through the hotel casino, Moe catches up to Harry and accidentally shoots him. Harry is pronounced dead and Moe flees.

Back in Newark, Moe hides out of sight at Harry's funeral. He is spotted by the huge Acavano (who is eating a sandwich during the burial service) and Castelo resolves to kill Moe after the service. Moe returns to his house and prepares to hang himself. Before doing so, sees a vision of Harry at the foot of the stairs. He quickly realizes that it is actually Harry, who arranged the whole thing with DiLea. Moe is thrilled, although he is so shocked that he is almost hanged anyway until Harry intervenes. Harry provides a skeleton for Moe and they write a suicide note before turning on the gas and setting fire to the curtains. As the two leave Moe's house, however, the door slams shut and puts the fire out. Castelo and his men enter to find a bizarre scene. Castelo takes out a cigarette, prompting his stooges to routinely spark their lighters for him. Acavano asks "Who farted?", prompting Castelo to realize the house is filled with gas just before the house explodes, with the crew inside it. Harry and Moe return to Atlantic City, where Moe bemoans the fact that they didn't keep the money. Harry informs him that he did save the money, but has invested it. Moe seems perturbed, but the film ends with their dream realized as the two stand in their Jewish-Italian delicatessen at DiLea's hotel.

Cast

Danny DeVito as Harry Valentini
Joe Piscopo as Moe Dickstein
Harvey Keitel as Bobby DiLea
Ray Sharkey as Marco
Dan Hedaya as Anthony Castelo
Lou Albano as Frank Acavano
Julie Bovasso as Lil Dickstein
Patti LuPone as Wanda Valentini
Antonia Rey as Aunt Sadie
Mimi Cecchini as Grandma Valentini
Matthew Kaye as Harry Valentini Jr.
Tony Munafo as Santo Ravallo
Tony Rizzoli as Joey Siclione
Frank Vincent as Louie Fontucci
Rick Petrucelli as Al
Anthony Holland as Karl
Dan Resin as Maitre D'
Jill Larson as Mrs Fixer
Maria Pitillo as Masseuse
Catherine Scorsese as Birthday Guest
Charles Scorsese as Birthday Guest

Reception
A positive review came from The New York Times, with Walter Goodman calling it amusing and fresh before concluding that "Everything works." Roger Ebert was similarly enthusiastic, giving the film three-and-a-half stars out of four and writing, "Wise Guys is an abundant movie, filled with ideas and gags and great characters. It never runs dry." Gene Siskel of the Chicago Tribune awarded a perfect grade of four stars and raved, "Big laughs, foul language to the point of absurdity and one hilarious, screaming performance atop another combine to make 'Wise Guys' one of the funniest times you will have at the movies this year." 

A negative review in Variety stated, "Gone are the flamboyant excesses that made a DePalma film instantly recognizable. What's left is a limp, visually dull look at limp, mentally dull people. Equally guilty is the cast of unfunny comics led by Joe Piscopo and Danny DeVito ... There is little chemistry between the two to suggest their supposed great friendship and more often than not they appear to be acting separately, each in a different film." Patrick Goldstein of the Los Angeles Times wrote, "Directed by Brian De Palma with an uncharacteristic twinkle in his eye, the film offers such a likeable gallery of cement-heads that we're in no mood to carp about the movie's creaky storyline, belabored gags or meandering chase scenes." Paul Attanasio of The Washington Post remarked, "There is plenty of dumb stuff in 'Wise Guys,' a rambunctious comedy about two screwballs on the loose, probably more than anyone should stand for. But the doughty will stick around for its small pleasures, most of which spring from the lens of Brian De Palma—yes, that Brian De Palma, the sanguinary scourge of women everywhere, who seems to have gotten into this as something of a lark."

The film has a 31% rating on Rotten Tomatoes, based on 16 reviews. Audiences polled by CinemaScore gave the film an average grade of "C−" on an A+ to F scale.

Home media 
After its original VHS release, Wise Guys was released on DVD by Warner Home Video on August 30, 2005, as a Region 1 widescreen DVD and more recently as a DVD-on-demand from Warner Archive Collection available through Amazon.

References

External links
 
 
 
 

1986 films
1980s English-language films
1980s black comedy films
1980s buddy comedy films
1980s crime comedy films
American black comedy films
American crime comedy films
American gangster films
American buddy comedy films
Films about the American Mafia
Films about contract killing
Films directed by Brian De Palma
Films scored by Ira Newborn
Films set in New Jersey
Films shot in Atlantic City, New Jersey
Films shot in New Jersey
Films shot in Newark, New Jersey
Films shot in New York City
Films about gambling
Mafia comedy films
Metro-Goldwyn-Mayer films
United Artists films
Works about debt
1986 comedy films
1980s American films
Films set in Atlantic City, New Jersey